Harry Crosby (1898–1929) was an American poet, founder Black Sun Press.

Harry Crosby may also refer to:

Bing Crosby (Harry Lillis Crosby, 1903–1977), American actor and singer
Harry Crosby (businessman) (born 1958), American actor, singer, and banker, son of Bing
Harry W. Crosby (born 1926), American historian and photographer

See also
Harold Crosby (disambiguation)